Conches-sur-Gondoire is a commune on the Gondoire river in Brie, in the Seine-et-Marne department in the Île-de-France region in north-central  France.

Its remarkable sights include a monastery church of the 12th century, and a Second Empire castle.

Until 1993, Conches-sur-Gondoire was simply called Conches. The name of the river was added to distinguish it from Conches-en-Ouche in Normandy (Eure county).

History
During the middle-ages, Conches-sur-Gondoire consisted of a monastery located on the top of a slope, but during the so-called "Wars of Religion" of the 16th century, the closter and the conventual buildings were destroyed by a troop of Protestant soldiers. Nowadays remain the church (13th century), a Gothic cellar with column and capital, a square pond faced with stones, tombs and peasant cottages. The valley meadows and fields have not been approved for development.

During the Second Empire, 19th century, the castle of Conches was built near the church. It is surrounded by a  park with a round pool and high trees (sequoias, cedars, plane trees). In Conches-sur-Gondoire, one of the remaining houses of the monastery belongs to French painter Maurice Boitel, who made numerous pictures in this village during the second half of the 20th century. During the sixties, his house was the meeting place for many painters, scientists, and musicians, including; Gabriel Deschamps, Pierre Gaillardot, Pierre Dejean, Maurice Faustino-Lafetat, Louis Vuillermoz, Albert Besson, Daniel du Janerand, and Françoise Ardré.

Demographics
The inhabitants are called Conchois.

Education
Schools serving the commune:
 Ecole Gustave Ribaud
 Ecole Val Guermantes (preschool and elementary school)
 Collège Léonard de Vinci in Saint-Thibault-des-Vignes

See also
Communes of the Seine-et-Marne department

References

External links

Homepage 
 Site about French painter Maurice Boitel 
1999 Land Use, from IAURIF (Institute for Urban Planning and Development of the Paris-Île-de-France région) 
 

Communes of Seine-et-Marne
Val de Bussy